Costa Chica may refer to:

 Costa Region, an area in the state of Oaxaca, Mexico
 Costa Chica of Guerrero, an area in the state of Guerrero, Mexico
 Costa Chica, Buenos Aires, a settlement in La Costa Partido department, Buenos Aires Province, Argentina

Coasts of Mexico